BTG Pactual is a Brazilian financial company that operates in the markets of investment banking, wealth management, asset management, corporate lending and sales and trading. It offers advisory services in mergers and acquisitions, wealth planning, loans and financings, as well as investment solutions and market analyses. It is the sixth largest banking institution in Brazil, the sixteenth largest in Latin America, and the largest investment bank in Latin America and the Caribbean.

With headquarters in Rio de Janeiro and São Paulo, the bank began as a brokerage firm in 1983 in Rio de Janeiro. With assets of US$72.6 bn and shares traded on the B3 and NYSE Euronext, BTG Pactual has offices in Latin American cities and world financial centers.

BTG Pactual is controlled by André Esteves, Roberto Sallouti, Nelson Jobim, John Huw Gwili Jenkins, Cláudio Eugênio Stiller Galeazzi, Mark Clifford Maletz, Eduardo Henrique de Mello Motta Loyo and Guilhermo Ortiz Martínez. On April 29, 2022, BTG shareholders confirmed the return of André Esteves as chairman. In 2018, Esteves was acquitted by  Federal Justice, and his case is already considered a judicial error.

History 
BTG Pactual began in 1983 in Rio de Janeiro as the brokerage firm Pactual DTVM, when its initial and primary activity was proprietary trading and securities sales and trading. In 1986, the asset management and investment bank areas were created. In 1989, the bank opened its São Paulo's office and started the internationalization of operations. Eleven years after the foundation, the bank started the wealth management activities.

In 1998, the company replaced its executive officers with a team led by André Esteves, Eduardo Plass, Marcelo Serfaty and Gilberto Sayão, and acquired Banco Bamerindus. In 2000, the bank opened Pactual Asset Management S.A. DTVM and an office in Cayman Islands. In 2003, the expansion continued with 
offices in Belo Horizonte and Recife.

In 2006, the UBS bought Banco Pactual for US$2.5 billion and created UBS Pactual, André Esteves became CEO of all UBS' Latin American operations. Two years later, Esteves left the bank to found BTG Investments with nine other founding partners of UBS and UBS Pactual, including Pérsio Arida, a former president of the Brazilian Central Bank. In 2009, BTG bought out UBS shareholders and created Banco BTG Pactual. The following year the bank issued US$1.8bn in capital, representing 18.65%, to a group of international investors and partners. In 2011, they acquired 51.00% of Banco PanAmericano shares. In 2012, BTG Pactual bought brokerages in Chile and Colombia, Celfin Capital and Bolsa y Renta, and held an initial public offering (IPO) raising R$3.65 billion, making it one of the 20 biggest companies listed on the B3.

In 2013, the bank, through its subsidiary BTG Pactual Timberland Investments Group LLC, acquired forest asset management contracts from Regions Timberland Group, a division of Regions Bank, the acquisition expanding its investment in forest assets. The deal established BTG Pactual as the biggest independent forest asset manager in Latin America and one of the biggest in the world, with assets of US$3bn and a portfolio of 716,000 hectares of land in North America, Latin America, Europe and Africa. In 2014, it made two acquisitions in Europe: British reinsurer Ariel Re bought for an undisclosed amount, and also Swiss bank BSI, for US$1.7 billion.

In 2017, BTG Pactual bought shares of companies such Anheuser-Busch InBev, Fibria Celulose, Gerdau, Staples and Telefónica Brasil.

Structure 

BTG Pactual was formed by Banco BTG Pactual and BTG Pactual Participations. The latter is the managing partner and controller of BTG Investments. Banco BTG Pactual is the main operating company of the group.

Business lines

Investment banking 
BTG Pactual helps companies, financial institutions and governments to obtain funding by issuing securities, and through structured and guaranteed loans. It also provides services in M&A, IPOs, FX operations, as well as trading in derivatives and commodities. The bank works in cross border transactions, involving counterparties from all continents and most of the IPOs and secondary offers made in the Brazilian market.

Corporate lending 
It lends funds to businesses. The bank has been growing in this market since the capitalizations in 2009 and 2012.

Sales and trading 
Products: market making, brokerage and settlement, transactions with derivatives, interest rates, exchange, equities, energy, insurance and reinsurance. These activities are divided into segments such as FICC (Fixed Income, Currencies and Commodities), Equities Sales & Trading and Energy.

Asset management 
It offers investment solutions in fixed income, variable income, hedge funds, infrastructure and real estate opportunities, and public and private equity funds. Also in the global hedge fund management market through BTG's flagship, the GEMM Fund, which manages $22 billion around the world and is among the 20 most profitable funds in the world.

Wealth management 
BTG Pactual offers financial advisory services to families that need to protect and expand their wealth, as well as succession and real estate planning.

Timberland investment 
BTG's timberland investment group (TIG) is responsible for agribusiness and timberland management, including tree farms and natural forests. It is one of the largest forest asset managers in the world, with investments in the US, Latin America, Europe and Africa.

Participations 
The bank invests its capital in two segments: private equity and principal investments. Private equity activities refer to the management of investments made in shares of private or publicly traded companies whose share cannot be freely traded on stock exchanges, and the capital is financed by other qualified investors and by the bank itself. The principal investments division is dedicated to the activities of owning investment in financial instruments and real estate worldwide.

BTG Pactual Digital 
The bank's online investment platform launched in 2014. Its retail clients have access to investment funds, fixed income products (CDB, LCA, LCI and LF), private pension (PGBL and VGBL) and COE - Certificate of Structured Operation, aimed at high-income retail in Brazil.

Startup 
BTG Pactual created a startup support program, a venture debt area specific to offer credit to startups, and started a fund to invest in global venture capital firms. The  is Banco BTG Pactual's program for connecting and leveraging startups at an advanced level. The partners and executives of BTG Pactual participate in the program as mentors, as well as a number of entrepreneurs, including from Silicon Valley.

In August 2020,  held the sixth edition of its startup potentiation program at the advanced level, selecting eight startups: Acordo Certo, Atta, Belvo, Conta Simples, Ludos Pró (edtech), Provi and Rede Compras.

Awards 

Best Private Bank in Latin America by PWM, 2020;
Best Private Bank in Colombia by PWM, 2020;
Best Private Bank in Latin America by Global Finance, 2020;
Best Private Bank in Colombia by Global Finance, 2020;
Best Private Bank for Digital advisory services Latin America by PWM, 2019 and 2020.
Best CEO – First Place – Nominated by the Buy Side and Sell Side 2019 by Institutional Investor.
The best of Dinheiro, category Specialized Banking Brazil, 2019.
Best Private Bank in Latin America by Global Finance, 2019.
Best Private Banking in Chile by Global Finance, 2019.
Best Bank to Invest – Digital Category by FGV and Fractal Consult, 2018 and 2019.
Pension Guide Valor Econômico/Fundação Getulio Vargas - Nominated by Featured Multimarkets Asset Manager, 2019.
Best Investment Bank by Euromoney (Awards for Excellence), 2019.
The World’s Best Investment Bank in the Emerging Markets by Euromoney (Awards for Excellence), 2019.
Best Investment Bank (in Brazil, Chile and Colombia) by World Finance, 2019.
Best Private Bak (in Brazil) by World Finance, 2019.
Investment Bank of the Year Brazil, Investment Bank of the Year Latam and Wealth Management Bank of the Year by LatinFinance, 2019;
ECM Leader (Latin America and Brazil) by Dealogic, 2019.
Best Financial Innovation Centers in the World for BoostLab by Global Finance, 2019.
Highly Commended at Best Private Bank in Brazil category by the Global Private Banking Awards 2016
 Best Private Bank in Colombia by the Global Private Banking Awards 2016
 Best Private Bank in Colombia by the Global Private Banking Awards 2017
 Best Equities Sales bank in Brazil at the 2017 Institutional Investor ranking
 Elect Best Global Macro Fund by the 2018 Investors Choice Awards
 Elect the Best Investment bank in Brazil, Chile and Colombia by the 2018 World Finance Banking Awards

Controversies

Insider trading 
This case was closed and there was no impact to the public offering. In 2012, penalties for André Esteves' insider trading "force[d] the bank to amend its prospectus, give investors the option to reconsidering bids for BTG shares, and put a cloud over one of this year's highest-profile bank deals." In "a statement, BTG Pactual said Esteves believed the allegations had no merit and was determined to appeal the decision." However, Esteves did not appeal, citing cost and a loss of time as his reasons.

Pactual sale to UBS and resale to BTG 

Arthur Rutishauser argued that the way 27% of BTG was acquired is an example of an insider case: André Esteves sold the bank in 2006 for 3 billion SFr to UBS, where Huw Jenkins was a key decision maker. Esteves later repurchased Pactual back in 2009 for 2.5 billion SFr after being allowed to leave UBS to set up BTG. Jenkins was ejected from UBS in 2007 and disappeared then resurfaced as a senior partner and board member at BTG Pactual in 2010.

BTG Pactual purchase of BSI 
In July 2014, BTG Pactual purchased Banca della Svizzera Italiana (BSI), with this being subject to the approval by the Swiss Financial Market Supervisory Authority (FINMA). The CEO of FINMA, Mark Branson, was previously the CEO of UBS Securities Japan Ltd. and reported directly to Huw Jenkins, CEO of UBS Investment Bank who is now a partner of BTG Pactual. Under Mark Branson, FINMA decided whether to approve BTG Pactual's purchase of BSI, although BTG Pactual was owned and operated by former superiors and colleagues Jenkins and Esteves, it clearly does not implicate any illegal activity whatsoever.

Misrepresentation allegation
The case was closed, a final settlement has been reached. An ex-employee of Hong Kong subsidiary BTG Pactual Asia Ltd, Zeljko Ivic, filed a claim alleging Banco BTG Pactual board member Huw Jenkins made fraudulent misrepresentations to Zeljko Ivic to induce him to sign agreements with the bank. Ivic said he had played a key role in Banco BTG Pactual's initial public offering (IPO) for which Jenkins had promised him a partnership and shares. Ivic, who valued his claim at some US$20 million, started proceedings after being dismissed in October 2013. In March 2017, the parties involved reached a final settlement.

External links 
 
BTG Digital

References 

Banks of Brazil
Companies based in Rio de Janeiro (city)
Companies based in São Paulo
Companies listed on B3 (stock exchange)
Investment banks
Brazilian brands